Cuoma, or Cuomaxiang is a village and township-level division of Amdo County in the Nagqu Prefecture of the Tibet Autonomous Region, in China.
 Cuoma township of Amdo County has existed since 1960 and was further expanded in 1987, but Cuoma has also been listed under the jurisdiction of Seqing Township of Nyainrong County. The principal economic activity is animal husbandry, pastoral yak, goat, sheep, and so on.

See also
List of towns and villages in Tibet

References

Township-level divisions of Tibet
Populated places in Nagqu
Amdo County